Princess Natasha is an American flash cartoon that was developed by Larry Schwarz for AOL Kids. The episodes were released between May 9, 2003 and July 1, 2006 and total 44 episodes overall, each running between 6 and 12 minutes apiece. The series follows the title character of Natasha, a princess of the fictional country of Zoravia. She must attend school in the United States, but without divulging that she is a princess or a spy.

The show has been featured on Cartoon Network, ABC Kids, and included products such as a game adaptation through Nintendo and a line of chapter books. Episodes of Princess Natasha were released on DVD in December 5, 2006 and plans were announced to create a line of bedding products featuring the character.

Synopsis
Natasha is the princess of the fictional Zoravia, which is composed of two parts: an old side and a new side. The old side holds all of the country's landmarks while the new side is more technologically advanced. The country is ruled over by King Karl, but was previously ruled over by his older brother Lubek. Lubek had been crowned king after the death of their father, but was ousted due to the kingdom unanimously disliking and voting against him. Upset, Lubek moved outside of the country and launched a series of attacks against Zoravia from the United States.

In order to stop these attacks the ruling family reluctantly allows their daughter Natasha to travel to the United States in order to stop Lubek's plans. However, she must keep her status of royalty and as a spy secret. While in the States, Natasha lives with the O'Brien family. Natasha develops a crush on their son Greg, who already had a girlfriend named Kelly that Natasha doesn't like. She also meets Maya, a tomboyish young girl that soon becomes one of Natasha's closest friends. School life is awkward for Natasha and is made more so by her duties to the crown, as she must sneak off to combat Lubek's latest plans.

Characters
Natasha: The main character of the show, Natasha lives in the United States as an exchange student but is secretly the princess of Zoravia as well as a secret agent. She's not popular at school and often feels overwhelmed by everything around her.
Maya: Natasha's best friend, Maya is a tomboy but not a very good student.
Oleg Boynski: He is a fellow spy and student along with Natasha, whom he gets along with.
Mr. and Mrs. O'Brien: The O'Briens host Natasha while she's residing in the United States.
K.C. O'Brien: A boy that's interested in gross things that often annoy Natasha and Greg.
Greg O'Brien: An attractive and popular but narcissistic 15-year-old boy. He is Kelly's boyfriend. Natasha has a crush on him.
Kelly: A self-absorbed girl that wears too much makeup and cheats off of her fellow students. She's Greg's girlfriend.
King Carl and Queen Lena: The rulers of Zoravia and Natasha's parents. They alert Natasha of anything that is going on in her home country.
Lubek: The main antagonist of the show. He is King Carl's older brother and Natasha's uncle who tried to launch several attacks on Zoravia and overthrow King Carl.

Episodes

Season 1

Season 2

Tie-in media

Comic book
A comic book adaptation of the series was released through DC Comics in 2006. The series ran for four issues and featured Natasha in several scenarios where she must fend off Lubek's attempts at control.

Games
There have been multiple games based upon the Princess Natasha series, many of which were flash games made available on the AOL Kids' website. A handheld game adaptation of the series was released through Nintendo on their Game Boy Advance and Nintendo DS systems, entitled Princess Natasha: Student/Secret Agent/Princess.

Gameplay for the Nintendo game involved players controlling the title character as she battles enemies and rescues citizens. IGN gave a negative review for the game, criticizing its monotonous gameplay and difficult controls. Nintendojo also gave a negative review for the game, saying that the "web is full of free flash games better than Natasha".

Books

Chapter books
Cloning Around (2006)
Time Warped (2006)
Game Over (2006)
Thunderstruck (2006)
Can It (2006)
Sweet Nothings (2006)

Other books
How to Draw Princess Natasha (2007)

References

American children's animated action television series
American children's animated comedy television series
American flash animated web series
Television shows set in Illinois
Video games featuring female protagonists
Fictional princesses
Fictional Eastern European people